Pedro Miguel Ruas Machado (born 22 June 1996) is a Portuguese professional footballer who plays for Vitória de Setúbal as a centre-back.

Football career
He made his Taça da Liga debut for Casa Pia on 28 July 2019 in a game against Vilafranquense.

References

External links

1996 births
People from Loulé
[[Category:Sportspeople from Faro District]
Living people
Portuguese footballers
Association football defenders
Louletano D.C. players
SC Mirandela players
Sertanense F.C. players
S.C. Olhanense players
Belenenses SAD players
Casa Pia A.C. players
U.D. Oliveirense players
FC U Craiova 1948 players
S.C.U. Torreense players
Vitória F.C. players
Liga Portugal 2 players
Campeonato de Portugal (league) players
Liga I players
Portuguese expatriate footballers
Portuguese expatriate sportspeople in Romania
Expatriate footballers in Romania